List of all electric tramcars of the Sheffield Corporation Tramways  (standard gauge). Opened 5 September 1899, closed 8 October 1960.

Cars built between 1899 and 1926

Cars built between 1927 and 1952

See also

Tram transport in Sheffield